Isabel le Despenser (1312 – living 1356, and died by 1374/5) was an English noblewoman. She was the eldest daughter of Hugh le Despenser, 2nd Baron le Despenser and Eleanor de Clare, suo jure 6th Lady of Glamorgan. Her mother was the eldest daughter of Joan of Acre, Princess of England; thus making Isabel a great-granddaughter of King Edward I by his first consort, Eleanor of Castile, while her father is famous for being the favourite of Edward II of England.

Marriage
Though he had stood against Edward II in the past, Edmund FitzAlan, 9th Earl of Arundel had loyally supported him since the 1320s. Thus it must have seemed to be politically prudent to Edmund to marry his heir Richard to the eldest daughter of the King's closest friend and adviser Hugh le Despenser. For Hugh's part, a large incentive for him must have been that he could expect his daughter Isabel would one day become Countess of Arundel.

On 9 February 1321 at the royal manor Havering-atte-Bower, Isabel was duly married to Richard FitzAlan, the heir to the earldom of Arundel. Isabel was only eight at the time, while Richard was seven. Their respective ages would come up later when Richard would try to seek an annulment.

Annulment and only child
Richard and Isabel had one son, Edmund Fitzalan (or Edmund de Arundel), born in 1329, and in 1331 Isabel's husband became Earl of Arundel. However, on 4 December 1344 Richard Fitzalan had their marriage annulled on the grounds that he had never freely consented to marry Isabel and that they both had renounced their vows at puberty but had been "forced by blows to cohabit, so that a son was born". Isabel retired to several manors in Essex that were given to her by her ex-husband. After receiving a papal dispensation, Richard married Isabel's first cousin Eleanor of Lancaster, with whom he had apparently been having an affair.

Richard and Isabel's only child, Edmund, was the heir to the earldom of Arundel until he was rendered illegitimate by the annulment of his parents' marriage in December 1344. Edmund married before 1347 (betrothed in January 1331 and married probably as a child), Lady Sybil de Montacute (or Montagu), daughter of William Montacute, 1st Earl of Salisbury and Catherine Grandison. He was subsequently knighted in 1352 at about twenty-three years of age and became an aristocratic knight owning numerous manors throughout the counties of Devon, Dorset, Somerset, and Sussex. In 1364 he was sent to Flanders on the king's service while in 1368 Pope Urban V sent him to King Edward III to communicate verbally "the present state of the Roman church in Italy". In 1369 and 1370, Edmund fought in several military campaigns in France including the Battle of Pontvallain under the command of his second cousin once removed, Edward the Black Prince, during the Hundred Years' War. When his father died in 1376 Edmund quarreled with his half-siblings, the children of his father's second marriage, over inheritance rights. He was imprisoned in the Tower of London until he was released in 1377 by request of his brothers-in-law, then, despite his persistent protests, he eventually lost his inheritance. In February 1381, he went to Gascony on a military expedition and died sometime before 12 February 1382. Sir Edmund and Lady Sybil de Montacute had three daughters who were his co-heiresses and who brought a failed suit in 1382 against their half-uncle, Richard FitzAlan, 11th Earl of Arundel (died 1397).

Father's execution

After their father was executed for treason in 1326, Isabel and her youngest sister Elizabeth were the only daughters of Hugh the Younger to escape being confined in nunneries, Isabel because she was already married and Elizabeth because of her youth.

Ancestry

References

Sources

1312 births
1356 deaths
English countesses
Isabel
14th-century English women
14th-century English people